Melicope orbicularis, also called Honokahua melicope or orbicular pelea, is a species of plant in the family Rutaceae. It is endemic to the Hawaiian Islands.  It is threatened by habitat loss.

References

External links

orbicularis
Endemic flora of Hawaii
Taxonomy articles created by Polbot